Inspector Gadget is a CGI animated series that debuted in 2015 and is a revival of the original traditionally animated (2-D) 1980's series of the same name. The series is produced and owned by DHX Media.

Series overview

Episodes

Season 1 (2015)

Season 2 (2015)

Season 3 (2017)

Season 4 (2018)

References

Lists of Canadian children's animated television series episodes